Mahatsara or Mahatsara Est is a village and commune in the district of Brickaville Vohibinany (district), Atsinanana Region, Madagascar.
The RN 2 it crosses the territory of the commune in Antsampanana.

It is located near the coast and near the mouth of the Laroka river, shortly before it flows into the Rianila river.

The following Fokontany (villages) also belong to the commune of Mahatsara:
Anatsara
Antsampanana
Mahavory
Menatsara

References

Populated places in Atsinanana